Dirty Dog is an album by jazz trombonist and arranger Kai Winding recorded in 1966 for the Verve label.

Reception

The Allmusic site awarded the album 3 stars.

Track listing
 "Dirty Dog" (Al Gafa) - 3:38
 "Sunrise, Sunset" (Jerry Bock, Sheldon Harnick) - 5:50
 "Cantaloupe Island" (Herbie Hancock) - 5:41
 "Blindman, Blindman" (Hancock) - 4:42
 "Something You Got" (Chris Kenner) - 5:06
 "The Sidewinder" (Lee Morgan) - 5:36
Recorded at A&R Recording Studio, NYC on March 28, 1968 (tracks 3, 4 & 6) and April 1, 1966 (tracks 1, 2 & 5)

Personnel 
Kai Winding - trombone, arranger, conductor
Carl Fontana, Urbie Green, Bill Watrous - trombone 
Herbie Hancock - piano
Kenny Burrell [listed as Buzzy Bavarian] - guitar
Bob Cranshaw - bass
Grady Tate - drums

References 

1966 albums
Verve Records albums
Kai Winding albums
Albums produced by Creed Taylor